The 2008–09 Northern Counties East Football League season was the 27th in the history of Northern Counties East Football League, a football competition in England.

Premier Division

The Premier Division featured 17 clubs which competed in the previous season, along with three new clubs.
Clubs promoted from Division One:
Dinnington Town
Hall Road Rangers

Plus:
Bridlington Town, relegated from the Northern Premier League

League table

Division One

Division One featured 13 clubs which competed in the previous season, along with six clubs:
Clubs joined from the Central Midlands League:
Appleby Frodingham
Askern Welfare, who also changed name to Askern Villa
Grimsby Borough

Clubs joined from the West Riding County League:
Brighouse Town
Hemsworth Miners Welfare

Plus:
Glasshoughton Welfare, relegated from the Premier Division

Also, Leeds Met Carnegie changed name to Leeds Carnegie.

League table

References

External links
 Northern Counties East Football League

2008-09
9